Sissel Buchholdt, née Brenne (born 17 June 1951) is a Norwegian handball player.

She played for the clubs SK Freidig and Skogn IL. She played more than 180 matches on the Norway women's national handball team from 1969 to 1984. She participated at the 1971, 1973, 1975 and 1982 World Women's Handball Championships.

She also competed in javelin throw at a national level. Representing the club IL Nybrott, she won a silver medal at the Norwegian championships in 1972 and a bronze medal in 1973. Her personal best throw was 46.84 metres, achieved in May 1974 at Bislett stadion.

References

External links

1951 births
Living people
People from Levanger
Norwegian female handball players
Norwegian female javelin throwers
Sportspeople from Trøndelag